Chaunochiton is a genus of flowering plants. In the APG IV system, the genus is placed in the family Olacaceae. Other sources place it in the segregate family Aptandraceae.

Its native range is Central and Southern Tropical America.

Species:

Chaunochiton angustifolium 
Chaunochiton kappleri 
Chaunochiton loranthoides

References

Olacaceae
Santalales genera